Alien Sex Fiend may refer to:

Alien Sex Fiend, a gothic rock/deathrock band from the UK
"Alien Sex Fiend", a song by Garbage on the B-side to the single "Stupid Girl"